Bobby Graham (4 August 1909 – 17 April 1963) was a British middle-distance runner. He competed in the men's 1500 metres at the 1936 Summer Olympics.

References

1909 births
1963 deaths
Athletes (track and field) at the 1936 Summer Olympics
British male middle-distance runners
Olympic athletes of Great Britain
Place of birth missing